Urbex may refer to:
 Urban exploration
 URBEX – Enter At Your Own Risk, a 2016 documentary series